Late goldenrod is a common name for several plants and may refer to:

Solidago altissima
Solidago gigantea